The 1991 Southern Conference men's basketball tournament took place from March 1–3, 1991 at the Asheville Civic Center in Asheville, North Carolina. The East Tennessee State Buccaneers, led by head coach Alan LeForce, won their third Southern Conference title and received the automatic berth to the 1991 NCAA tournament.

Format
Seven of the conference's eight members participated in the tournament (Marshall was ineligible). Teams were seeded based on conference winning percentage. The tournament used a preset bracket consisting of three rounds.

Bracket

* Overtime game

See also
List of Southern Conference men's basketball champions

References

Tournament
Southern Conference men's basketball tournament
Southern Conference men's basketball tournament
Southern Conference men's basketball tournament
Basketball competitions in Asheville, North Carolina
College sports tournaments in North Carolina
College basketball in North Carolina